Netrium is a genus of algae belonging to the family Mesotaeniaceae.

The species of this genus are found in Europe, America and Australia.

Species:

Netrium digitus 
Netrium interruptum 
Netrium lamellosum
Netrium naegelii 
Netrium obesus 
Netrium oblongum

References

Zygnematales
Charophyta genera